Basil Heal Francis (February 21, 1915 – March 23, 1974) was an American swimmer. He competed in the men's 200 metre breaststroke at the 1932 Summer Olympics.

References

1915 births
1974 deaths
American male swimmers
Olympic swimmers of the United States
Swimmers at the 1932 Summer Olympics
Swimmers from Maine
People from Searsmont, Maine